Dandii Boru University College is a private college in Ethiopia, East Africa.  It has campuses in Dessie, Jimma, Nekemte and  Shambu.  Dandii Boru also has a primary, secondary and high school in the capital Addis Ababa.

Universities and colleges in Ethiopia